Clinton–Sampson County Airport  is a public use airport located two nautical miles (4 km) southwest of the central business district of Clinton, a city in Sampson County, North Carolina, United States. It is owned by the city and county. This airport is included in the National Plan of Integrated Airport Systems for 2011–2015, which categorized it as a general aviation facility. It was formerly known as Sampson County Airport.

Facilities and aircraft 
Clinton–Sampson County Airport covers an area of 114 acres (46 ha) at an elevation of 144 feet (44 m) above mean sea level. It has one runway designated 6/24 with an asphalt surface measuring 5,002 by 74 feet (1,525 x 23 m).

For the 12-month period ending September 4, 2009, the airport had 5,200 aircraft operations, an average of 14 per day: 86.5% general aviation, 11.5% military, and 2% air taxi. At that time there were 27 aircraft based at this airport: 89% single-engine, 7% jet, and 4% multi-engine.

References

External links 
  at North Carolina DOT airport guide
 Aerial image as of March 1998 from USGS The National Map
 

Airports in North Carolina
Transportation in Sampson County, North Carolina
Buildings and structures in Sampson County, North Carolina